Adinauclea is a monospecific genus of flowering plants in the family Rubiaceae. It was described by Colin Ernest Ridsdale in 1978. The genus contains only one species, viz. Adinauclea fagifolia, which is found in Sulawesi and the Moluccas.

References

External links
Adinauclea in the World Checklist of Rubiaceae

Monotypic Rubiaceae genera
Naucleeae
Flora of Sulawesi
Flora of the Maluku Islands